The 2004 South Carolina Gamecocks baseball team represented the University of South Carolina in the 2004 NCAA Division I baseball season. The Gamecocks played their home games at Sarge Frye Field. The team was coached by Ray Tanner in his 8th season at South Carolina.

Roster

College World Series lineup

Schedule and results

! style="" | Regular Season (41–15)
|- valign="top"

|- align="center" bgcolor="#ccffcc"
| ||  || Sarge Frye Field • Columbia, SC || 3–2 || 1–0 || –
|- align="center" bgcolor="#ccffcc"
| || Charleston Southern || Sarge Frye Field • Columbia, SC || 38–0 || 2–0 || –
|- align="center" bgcolor="#ccffcc"
| || Charleston Southern || Sarge Frye Field • Columbia, SC || 3–0 || 3–0 || –
|- align="center" bgcolor="#ccffcc"
| ||  || Sarge Frye Field • Columbia, SC || 7–4 || 4–0 || –
|- align="center" bgcolor="#ccffcc"
| || UNC Wilmington || Sarge Frye Field • Columbia, SC || 20–3 || 5–0 || –
|- align="center" bgcolor="#ccffcc"
| || UNC Wilmington || Sarge Frye Field • Columbia, SC || 12–0 || 6–0 || –
|- align="center" bgcolor="#ccffcc"
| || vs  || Sarge Frye Field • Columbia, SC || 20–2 || 7–0 || –
|- align="center" bgcolor="#ccffcc"
| || vs  || Sarge Frye Field • Columbia, SC || 11–0 || 8–0 || –
|- align="center" bgcolor="#ccffcc"
| || vs  || Sarge Frye Field • Columbia, SC || 5–0 || 9–0 || –
|-

|- align="center" bgcolor="#ccffcc"
| ||  || Sarge Frye Field • Columbia, SC || 7–4 || 10–0 || –
|- align="center" bgcolor="#ccffcc"
| || Clemson || Sarge Frye Field • Columbia, SC || 5–2 || 11–0 || –
|- align="center" bgcolor="#ccffcc"
| || at Clemson || Beautiful Tiger Field • Clemson, SC || 8–7 || 12–0 || –
|- align="center" bgcolor="#ccffcc"
| ||  || Sarge Frye Field • Columbia, SC || 6–1 || 13–0 || –
|- align="center" bgcolor="#ccffcc"
| || Yale || Sarge Frye Field • Columbia, SC || 9–2 || 14–0 || –
|- align="center" bgcolor="#ccffcc"
| || || Sarge Frye Field • Columbia, SC || 4–2 || 15–0 || –
|- align="center" bgcolor="#ccffcc"
| || Delaware State || Sarge Frye Field • Columbia, SC || 7–0 || 16–0 || –
|- align="center" bgcolor="#ccffcc"
| || Delaware State || Sarge Frye Field • Columbia, SC || 16–3 || 17–0 || –
|- align="center" bgcolor="#ccffcc"
| ||  || Sarge Frye Field • Columbia, SC || 10–1 || 18–0 || –
|- align="center" bgcolor="#ffcccc"
| ||  || Sarge Frye Field • Columbia, SC || 3–6 || 18–1 || 0–1
|- align="center" bgcolor="#ccffcc"
| || LSU || Sarge Frye Field • Columbia, SC || 12–5 || 19–1 || 1–1
|- align="center" bgcolor="#ffcccc"
| || LSU || Sarge Frye Field • Columbia, SC || 7–12 || 19–2 || 1–2
|- align="center" bgcolor="#ccffcc"
| ||  || Russell C. King Field • Spartanburg, SC || 12–1 || 20–2 || 1–2
|- align="center" bgcolor="#ffcccc"
| || at Arkansas || Baum–Walker Stadium • Fayetteville, AR || 3–5 || 20–3 || 1–3
|- align="center" bgcolor="#ffcccc"
| || at Arkansas || Baum–Walker Stadium • Fayetteville, AR || 4–5 || 20–4 || 1–4
|- align="center" bgcolor="#ccffcc"
| || at Arkansas || Baum–Walker Stadium • Fayetteville, AR || 10–2 || 21–4 || 2–4
|-

|- align="center" bgcolor="#ffcccc"
| || at  || Hawkins Field • Nashville, TN || 2–6 || 21–5 || 2–5
|- align="center" bgcolor="#ccffcc"
| || at Vanderbilt || Hawkins Field • Nashville, TN || 6–3 || 22–5 || 3–5
|- align="center" bgcolor="#ccffcc"
| || at Vanderbilt || Hawkins Field • Nashville, TN || 10–4 || 23–5 || 4–5
|- align="center" bgcolor="#ffcccc"
| || Clemson || Sarge Frye Field • Columbia, SC || 4–9 || 23–6 || 4–5
|- align="center" bgcolor="#ccffcc"
| || Florida || Sarge Frye Field • Columbia, SC || 5–4 || 24–6 || 5–5
|- align="center" bgcolor="#ffcccc"
| || Florida || Sarge Frye Field • Columbia, SC || 8–9 || 24–7 || 5–6
|- align="center" bgcolor="#ccffcc"
| || Florida || Sarge Frye Field • Columbia, SC || 7–6 || 25–7 || 6–6
|- align="center" bgcolor="#ffcccc"
| || Clemson || Sarge Frye Field • Columbia, SC || 5–13 || 25–8 || 6–6
|- align="center" bgcolor="#ffcccc"
| || at  || Cliff Hagan Stadium • Lexington, KY || 3–6 || 25–9 || 6–7
|- align="center" bgcolor="#ffcccc"
| || at Kentucky || Cliff Hagan Stadium • Lexington, KY || 6–11 || 25–10 || 6–8
|- align="center" bgcolor="#ccffcc"
| || at Kentucky || Cliff Hagan Stadium • Lexington, KY || 5–3 || 26–10 || 7–8
|- align="center" bgcolor="#ccffcc"
| || The Citadel || Sarge Frye Field • Columbia, SC || 5–2 || 27–10 || 7–8
|- align="center" bgcolor="#ccffcc"
| ||  || Sarge Frye Field • Columbia, SC || 6–3 || 28–10 || 8–8
|- align="center" bgcolor="#ffcccc"
| || Alabama || Sarge Frye Field • Columbia, SC || 4–7 || 28–11 || 8–9
|- align="center" bgcolor="#ccffcc"
| || Alabama || Sarge Frye Field • Columbia, SC || 1–0 || 29–11 || 9–9
|- align="center" bgcolor="#ccffcc"
| || Wofford || Sarge Frye Field • Columbia, SC || 3–0 || 30–11 || 9–9
|- align="center" bgcolor="#ccffcc"
| ||  || Sarge Frye Field • Columbia, SC || 7–3 || 31–11 || 10–9
|-

|- align="center" bgcolor="#ffcccc"
| || Ole Miss || Sarge Frye Field • Columbia, SC || 1–6 || 31–12 || 10–10
|- align="center" bgcolor="#ccffcc"
| || Ole Miss || Sarge Frye Field • Columbia, SC || 3–0 || 32–12 || 11–10
|- align="center" bgcolor="#ffcccc"
| || at  || Plainsman Park • Auburn, AL || 9–12 || 32–13 || 11–11
|- align="center" bgcolor="#ccffcc"
| || at Auburn || Plainsman Park • Auburn, AL || 3–1 || 33–13 || 12–11
|- align="center" bgcolor="#ccffcc"
| || at Auburn || Plainsman Park • Auburn, AL || 12–11 || 34–13 || 13–11
|- align="center" bgcolor="#ccffcc"
| || vs.  || Fort Mill, SC || 9–4 || 35–13 || 13–11
|- align="center" bgcolor="#ccffcc"
| || at The Citadel || Joseph P. Riley Jr. Park • Charleston, SC || 6–1 || 36–13 || 13–11
|- align="center" bgcolor="#ccffcc"
| ||  || Sarge Frye Field • Columbia, SC || 2–1 || 37–13 || 14–11
|- align="center" bgcolor="#ccffcc"
| || Tennessee || Sarge Frye Field • Columbia, SC || 2–0 || 38–13 || 15–11
|- align="center" bgcolor="#ccffcc"
| || Tennessee || Sarge Frye Field • Columbia, SC || 12–8 || 39–13 || 16–11
|- align="center" bgcolor="#ccffcc"
| || Wofford || Sarge Frye Field • Columbia, SC || 5–3 || 40–13 || 16–11
|- align="center" bgcolor="#ffcccc"
| || at  || Foley Field • Athens, GA || 1–5 || 40–14 || 16–12
|- align="center" bgcolor="#ffcccc"
| || at Georgia || Foley Field • Athens, GA || 4–6 || 40–15 || 16–13
|- align="center" bgcolor="#ccffcc"
| || at Georgia || Foley Field • Athens, GA || 8–2 || 41–15 || 17–13
|- align="center" bgcolor="white"

|-
! style="" | Postseason (12–2)
|-

|- align="center" bgcolor="#ccffcc"
| || vs Ole Miss || Hoover Metropolitan Stadium • Hoover, AL || 7–6 || 42–15 || 17–13
|- align="center" bgcolor="#ccffcc"
| || vs Tennessee || Hoover Metropolitan Stadium • Hoover, AL || 5–1 || 43–15 || 17–13
|- align="center" bgcolor="#ccffcc"
| || vs Arkansas || Hoover Metropolitan Stadium • Hoover, AL || 3–2 || 44–15 || 17–13
|- align="center" bgcolor="#ccffcc"
| || vs Vanderbilt || Hoover Metropolitan Stadium • Hoover, AL || 3–2 || 45–15 || 17–13
|-

|- align="center" bgcolor="#ccffcc"
| || The Citadel || Sarge Frye Field • Columbia, SC || 12–4 || 46–15 || 17–13
|- align="center" bgcolor="#ccffcc"
| || North Carolina || Sarge Frye Field • Columbia, SC || 5–2 || 47–15 || 17–13
|- align="center" bgcolor="#ccffcc"
| || North Carolina || Sarge Frye Field • Columbia, SC || 7–6 || 48–15 || 17–13
|-

|- align="center" bgcolor="#ccffcc"
| ||  || Sarge Frye Field • Columbia, SC || 4–2 || 49–15 || 17–13
|- align="center" bgcolor="#ccffcc"
| || East Carolina || Sarge Frye Field • Columbia, SC || 5–3 || 50–15 || 17–13
|-

|- align="center" bgcolor="#ffcccc"
| || vs Cal State Fullerton || Rosenblatt Stadium • Omaha, NE || 0–3 || 50–16 || 17–13
|- align="center" bgcolor="#ccffcc"
| || vs LSU || Rosenblatt Stadium • Omaha, NE || 15–4 || 51–16 || 17–13
|- align="center" bgcolor="#ccffcc"
| || vs Miami (FL) || Rosenblatt Stadium • Omaha, NE || 15–11 || 52–16 || 17–13
|- align="center" bgcolor="#ccffcc"
| || vs Cal State Fullerton || Rosenblatt Stadium • Omaha, NE || 5–3 || 53–16 || 17–13
|- align="center" bgcolor="#ffcccc"
| || vs Cal State Fullerton || Rosenblatt Stadium • Omaha, NE || 0–4 || 53–17 || 17–13
|-

| Schedule Source:

Awards and honors 
Landon Powell
All Tournament Team

Steve Pearce
All Tournament Team

Bryan Triplett
All Tournament Team

Gamecocks in the 2004 MLB Draft
The following members of the South Carolina Gamecocks baseball program were drafted in the 2004 Major League Baseball Draft.

References

South Carolina
South Carolina Gamecocks baseball seasons
South Carolina Gamecocks baseball
College World Series seasons
South Carolina